Piiumetsa Landscape Conservation Area is a nature park which is located in Järva County, Estonia.

The area of the nature park is 1136 ha.

The protected area was founded in 1981 on the basis of Piiumetsa Wetland Protection Area. Under protection are wetland areas in Kaiu and Käru Parish. In 2006, the protected area was designated to the landscape conservation area.

References

Nature reserves in Estonia
Geography of Järva County